Air Tetiaroa is a private airline in French Polynesia which provides flights between Tahiti and the atoll of Tetiaroa, home to The Brando Resort.

History
The airline was created in 2013 and obtained its CTA (Air Carrier Certificate) in August 2014 with a BN2T type aircraft received in May 2014. It opened its maintenance workshop in August 2016. In October 2018 it expanded its fleet with a second Britten-Norman BN-2 Islander. In October 2020 it took delivery of a second Twin Otter aircraft. By 2021 it was the second most active airline in French Polynesia, after Air Tahiti.

Fleet and Services
Air Tetiaroa operates two eight-passenger Britten-Norman aircraft and two Twin Otter aircraft and primarily flies between Iahiti and the Brando Resort. It maintains a private terminal at Faa’a International Airport in Tahiti. The journey from Papeete to Tetiaroa takes 15 minutes. It also offers charter flights to resort guests and outside customers.

References

Airlines of French Polynesia
2013 establishments in French Polynesia